This family tree of the Kings of Hungary includes only kings of Hungary and their descendants who are relevant to the succession.

See also 

King of Hungary
Holy Crown of Hungary

Hungary, Kings of
 Family tree